Chirala revenue division is an administrative division in the Bapatla district of the Indian state of Andhra Pradesh. It is one of the three revenue divisions in the district and comprises 10 mandals. It was formed on 4 April 2022 along with the newly formed Bapatla district. Initially, Chirala Revenue Division was created with 13 Mandals, but later with the formation of the Repalle Revenue Division, three mandals (Parchur, Marturu, and Yeddanpudi) were brought under Bapatla Revenue Division.

Administration 
The revenue division comprises 10 mandals which include Chirala mandal, Vetapalem mandal, Chinaganjam mandal, Karamchedu mandal, Inkollu mandal, Korisapadu mandal, J. Panguluru mandal, Addanki mandal, Ballikurava mandal, Santhamaguluru mandal .

References 

2022 establishments in Andhra Pradesh
Bapatla district